Bill Gilligan (born August 5, 1954) is an American professional ice hockey coach. He is also a former professional ice hockey winger who played in 128 World Hockey Association regular season games with the Cincinnati Stingers between 1977 and 1979 before moving to Europe.

Playing career 
In addition to the WHA Stingers, Bill Gilligan played for Brown University (NCAA), Hampton Gulls (AHL), Vienna EV and Klagenfurt AC in Austria and EHC Chur in Switzerland. He was also a member of Team USA in the 1978 and 1983 Ice Hockey World Championship tournaments.

Coaching career 
He first became coach in 1984 in Klagenfurt, Austria, where he won 4 Championships in a row right away. From season 1988/89 to season 1991/1992 Gilligan was head coach of Swiss ice hockey team SC Bern. He won 3 NLA Championships and was one time runners up in 4 years. He later was head coach of the Swiss U-20 national ice hockey team and together with John Sletvoll also of the Swiss national team. From 1994 - 1998, Gilligan was Sports Director of SC Bern and then returned to the US to work as assistant coach for the hockey team of University of Massachusetts Amherst, the Massachusetts Minutemen and as a scout for NHL team Los Angeles Kings.

For season 2005/06 he came back to Switzerland as head coach for NLA team Rapperswil-Jona Lakers. He is also the team's head coach for 2006/07 season.

In 2008 was named as Head Coach from Graz 99ers, in the 2009/2010 season Graz won the playoff qualification for the first time. Gilligan additionally coached the Austrian national team in 2008-2011. In 2014, Gilligan was named Associate Coach of Merrimack College in North Andover, Massachusetts.

Awards and honors

Playing

Coaching
 1985 - Austrian Champion with Klagenfurt AC
 1986 - Austrian Champion with Klagenfurt AC
 1987 - Austrian Champion with Klagenfurt AC
 1988 - Austrian Champion with Klagenfurt AC
 1989 - NLA Champion with SC Bern
 1991 - NLA Champion with SC Bern
 1992 - NLA Champion with SC Bern

References

External links
 Bill Gilligan on hockeyfans.ch
 

1954 births
Living people
AHCA Division I men's ice hockey All-Americans
American ice hockey coaches
American men's ice hockey right wingers
Cincinnati Stingers players
Hampton Gulls (AHL) players
Ice hockey coaches from Massachusetts
Los Angeles Kings scouts
Sportspeople from Beverly, Massachusetts
SC Bern coaches
Ice hockey players from Massachusetts